Nam Nhou is a district of Bokeo Province, Laos.

References 

Districts of Laos